Alexander Rogers (4 June 1869 – 2 August 1928) was an Australian politician.

He was born in Essendon to carpenter Henry Rogers and Jessie Forbes. He was a butcher at Port Melbourne and was a member of the Trades Hall Council. On 11 December 1890 he married Ellen Harvey, with whom he had five children. He served on Port Melbourne City Council from 1904 to 1910 and was mayor from 1908 to 1909. In 1908 he was elected to the Victorian Legislative Assembly as the Labor member for Melbourne. He served until 1924, when he retired from politics. Rogers died in Preston in 1928.

References

1869 births
1928 deaths
Australian Labor Party members of the Parliament of Victoria
Members of the Victorian Legislative Assembly